Oraphanes binotatum is a species of beetle in the family Cerambycidae, the only species in the genus Oraphanes.

References

Hesperophanini